Paul A. Wender is an American chemist whose work is focused on organic chemistry, organometallic chemistry, synthesis, catalysis, chemical biology, imaging, drug delivery, and molecular therapeutics. He is currently the Francis W. Bergstrom Professor of Chemistry at Stanford University and is an Elected Fellow at the American Association for the Advancement of Science and the American Academy of Arts and Sciences.

Biography 
Born in 1947, Wender received his B.S. from Wilkes University in 1969, and his Ph.D. degree from Yale University in 1973. At Yale he worked with Frederick E. Ziegler, graduating with a thesis on the transformation of ketones into nitriles, and the total synthesis of eremophilone. He was a post-doctoral fellow at Columbia University in 1974. In 1974, he began his independent career as an assistant professor and later associate professor at Harvard University. In 1982, he became a professor at Stanford University. He is currently the Francis W. Bergstrom Professor of Chemistry there.

His research involves the targeted synthesis of complex biologically interesting molecules. He  coined the term "function-oriented synthesis." He pursues applications for drugs in cancer therapy, for example, and synthesized phorbol, taxol, resiniferatoxin and prostatin, among others. Because of his work on the synthesis of indole derivatives, the Wender indole synthesis he described in 1981 was named after him.

Selected awards and honors 

 Ernest Guenther Award, 1988
 Arthur C. Cope Scholar Award, 1990
 Fellow, American Academy of Arts and Sciences, 1992
 American Chemical Society Award for Creative work in Synthetic Organic Chemistry, 1998
 Fellow, American Association for the Advancement of Science, 2001
 American Chemical Society H.C. Brown Award for Creative Research in Synthetic Methods, 2003
 Member of the National Academy of Sciences, 2003;
 Tetrahedron Prize for Creativity in Organic Chemistry, 2012
 Foreign member - Spanish Royal Academy of Sciences, 2013
 ACS Arthur C. Cope Award, 2015

References

See also 
Wender Taxol total synthesis

Living people
Stanford University faculty
21st-century American chemists
Yale Graduate School of Arts and Sciences alumni
1947 births
Wilkes University alumni